Calathus longicollis is a species of ground beetle from the Platyninae subfamily that can be found in Bulgaria, Greece, Russia, Armenia, Cyprus, Georgia, Israel, Lebanon and Turkey.

References

longicollis
Beetles described in 1865
Beetles of Asia
Beetles of Europe
Taxa named by Victor Motschulsky